Thomas Brooke, 2nd Viscount Alanbrooke (9 January 1920 – 19 December 1972) was a British peer. He was the son of Field Marshal Alan Brooke, 1st Viscount Alanbrooke.

From an Ulster Anglo-Irish aristocratic family, Brooke received his education at Wellington College in Berkshire and fought in the Second World War in the Royal Artillery. He was a writer and a water colour artist. He was unmarried and the viscountcy passed to his half-brother, Victor. Upon the death of the 3rd Viscount in 2018, the viscountcy became extinct.

References

External links

1920 births
1972 deaths
People educated at Wellington College, Berkshire
Royal Artillery officers
British Army personnel of World War II